The 2012 Orlando mayoral election was held on Tuesday, April 3, 2012, to elect the mayor of Orlando, Florida.  Incumbent mayor Buddy Dyer was elected to a third full term.

Municipal elections in Orlando and Orange County are non-partisan.  Had no candidate received a majority of the votes in the general election, a runoff would have been held on Tuesday, May 1, 2012, between the two candidates that received the greatest number of votes.

General election

Candidates
 Mike Cantone, political organizer and progressive activist
 Phil Diamond, member of the Orlando City Council, District 1
 Buddy Dyer, incumbent mayor
 Ken Mulvaney, businessman and candidate for mayor in 2004 and 2008

Declined
 Linda Grund, foster care advocate (dropped out)

Results

References

2012
2012 Florida elections
2012 United States mayoral elections
2010s in Orlando, Florida